The 1945 Yanks season was their second in the National Football League. They merged with the Brooklyn Tigers for the season and played under the name Yanks. The team improved on their previous season's output of 2–8, winning three games. They failed to qualify for the playoffs for the second consecutive season. Four home games were played in Boston and the home game against the New York Giants was played at Yankee Stadium. The result of these two teams merging for a season is similar to the Steagles and Card-Pitt teams.

1945 season
The Yanks started well with an win at Fenway Park over Pittsburgh, played on Tuesday, September 25, as both Boston baseball teams were at home over the weekend. (As of 2021, this is the last NFL game actually scheduled to be played on a Tuesday.) After a victory over eventual Eastern Division champion Washington, a tie with the Giants in Yankee Stadium and splitting two road games, the Yanks were 3–1–1, tied with the 3–1 Redskins atop the East (ties did not count in the standings then). 

After that, it all came apart. After a tough 10–9 loss to Detroit at Fenway Park (Don Currivan caught a touchdown pass late in the fourth quarter only to watch the extra point attempt go awry), the Yanks were crushed in their final four contests, finding the end zone only three times while allowing a whopping 117 points. They finished 3–6–1, tied for third with New York.

Standings

References

1945
Yanks
1940s in Boston
Yanks
Yanks